The Shafer's Grocery and Residence is a commercial and residential building located at 1018 Emmet Street in Petoskey, Michigan. It was added to the National Register of Historic Places in 1986.

Shafer's Grocery and Residence consists of two attached structures: the store and associated residence. The store is a single-story frame commercial structure with a central entrance between large glass windows. The store has a flat roof with a simple bracketed cornice. The walls of the structure are clad with asbestos shingles. The attached residence is a two-story gabled structure with a front porch running the full width of the house.

The structure was built for the grocery business of Robert Shafer, who operated here in the late 19th century. By the 1930s, a used furniture business operated by Jennie Cross was located here.

References

Houses on the National Register of Historic Places in Michigan
Italianate architecture in Michigan
Emmet County, Michigan
Grocery store buildings